Tompson is a surname. Notable people with the surname include:

 Charles Tompson (1807–1883), Australian public servant and poet
 Frederick A. Tompson (1857–1919), American architect 
 Nockold Tompson (1714–1777), English mayor 
 Ruthie Tompson (1910–2021), American animator and artist

See also
Thompson (surname)

English-language surnames
Surnames from given names